The 2018 NCAA Division III Cross Country Championships was the 46th annual NCAA Men's Division III Cross Country Championship and the 38th annual NCAA Women's Division III Cross Country Championship to determine the team and individual national champions of NCAA Division III men's and women's collegiate cross country running in the United States. In all, four different titles were contested: men's and women's individual and team championships.

The women's race team title was won by Washington University, their 2nd title. Washington narrowly edged out defending champion Johns Hopkins by a single point, making it the narrowest margin of victory since 1987. The women's individual title was won by junior Paige Lawler of Washington University, becoming the first cross country individual champion in program history. In the men's race, the team title was won by North Central, their 19th title (and 3rd in a row). The Cardinals 43 point victory was the 3rd lowest winning score in the history of the men's race (and the lowest score since 2006). The men's individual title went to Dhruvil Patel of North Central, the 8th Cardinal to win the individual men's title in program history, and the first since 2000.

Women's title
Distance: 6,000 meters

Women's Team Result (Top 10)

Women's Individual Result (Top 10)

Men's title
Distance: 8,000 meters

Men's Team Result (Top 10)

Men's Individual Result (Top 10)

See also
 NCAA Women's Division III Cross Country Championship
 NCAA Men's Division III Cross Country Championship

References 

NCAA Cross Country Championships
NCAA Division III championships
2018 in sports in Wisconsin